Tangerine Dream is a German electronic music band.

Tangerine Dream may also refer to:

Music 
 Tangerine Dream (Kaleidoscope album), 1967
 Tangerine Dream (Miss Li album), 2012
 Tangerine Dream, a mixtape by Alex Wiley
 "Tangerine Dream" (song), a 1999 song by Do As Infinity

Other uses 
 Tangerine Dream (cannabis), a sativa-dominant hybrid strain of cannabis
 Tangerine Dream, a film by ski filmmakers Teton Gravity Research
 Tangerine Dream, a fictional gas planet in the Revelation Space novel series
 Tangerine Dreams, a computer that The Cheat uses in the Homestar Runner cartoons